Salvatore Capezio (1871–1940) was an Italian-born shoemaker who established Capezio, one of the world's largest manufacturers of dance apparel and specialized dance shoes, including ballet pointe shoes. He was born in Muro Lucano, Italy.

Several scholarships and awards for dancers have been established in Salvatore Capezio's name.

References 
Capezio Company History (also see https://web.archive.org/web/20061215163634/http://www.capeziodanceeu.com/history.asp)
Capezio/Ballet Makers Inc., E-notes (accessed December 12, 2006)

External links

Ballet shoes

1871 births
1940 deaths
People from Muro Lucano
Italian emigrants to the United States
Italian businesspeople
Shoemakers